Eremohadena roseonitens is a moth of the family Noctuidae, found in Malta and Spain. It was first described by Charles Oberthür in 1887.

References

External links
 "Eremohadena roseonitens (Oberthur, 1887)". Insecta.pro. Retrieved February 5, 2020.

Xyleninae
Moths described in 1887
Moths of Europe
Taxa named by Charles Oberthür